The men's 90 kg weightlifting competitions at the 1952 Summer Olympics in Helsinki took place on 27 July at Messuhalli. It was the first appearance of the middle heavyweight class (or, as it was listed in the 1952 Official Report, the "heavy lightweight" class). Previously all weightlifters above the light heavyweight (82.5 kg) class competed together in the heavyweight class; this new middle heavyweight class featured weightlifters between 82.5 kg and 90 kg.

Each weightlifter had three attempts at each of the three lifts. The best score for each lift was summed to give a total. The weightlifter could increase the weight between attempts (minimum of 5 kg between first and second attempts, 2.5 kg between second and third attempts) but could not decrease weight. If two or more weightlifters finished with the same total, the competitors' body weights were used as the tie-breaker (lighter athlete wins).

Records
Prior to this competition, the existing world and Olympic records were as follows.

Results

New records

Because the weight class was new to the Olympics, there was certain to be an initial Olympic record in each lift as well as the total. Schemansky, however, broke his own world records from the 1951 World Weightlifting Championships in two of the lifts as well as the combined score. Novak, who had set the world record in the press earlier in the year at 143 kg, was not able to match that score but still led handily in that lift at 140 kg (12.5 kg over Schemansky's second-place 127.5 kg).

Notes

References

Weightlifting at the 1952 Summer Olympics